Ivanje may refer to:
 Ivanje, Bijelo Polje, Montenegro
 Ivanje, Bojnik, Serbia
 Ivanje (Prijepolje), a village in Prijepolje, Serbia